Panto! is a 2012 one-off Christmas special, made by Baby Cow Productions and broadcast by ITV on Thursday 27 December 2012.
The special centres on Lewis Loud, a local Morecambe disk jockey in his stage debut of Dick Whittington 
at the Grand Theatre, Lancaster as Jack the Lad.

Plot 
Lewis Loud (John Bishop) is doing his early morning radio show at Morecambe FM  with his less than impressed producer Deborah (Lisa Jackson) at his side. 

After the show, Lewis heads to rehearsals for his first ever pantomime Dick Whittington where a romance between him and Dick, Tamsin (Sheridan Smith)  has been blossoming. Tamsin is also known as 'Mad Mindy, The Axe Murderer' from the nation's favourite soap. A full dress-rehearsal has been called for the show   by Producer Di (Samantha Spiro) as tensions begin to build. Di's nervous daughter Chantelle (Ami Metcalf) stars as the obvious miscast love interest of Dick while Director Francis (Mark Benton) tries hard to pull the show together while Di keeps interfering with his decisions. Johnny Darby (Michael Cochrane) a famous Channel 5 star goes into drag while accident prone Chesney Hawkes tries to make the show. While all this is happening, Lewis' son Paul (played by Bishop's real-life son Daniel) is dropped off with him while Lewis' ex-wife Gina (Kaye Wragg) and her new boyfriend Tony (Trevor Dwyer-Lynch) go on an exotic holiday that they won by creating a jingle for a toilet company. 

Tamsin gets offered by her agent Jerry (Kenneth Cranham) to go on Celebrity Sleigh Ride, a new reality show which sees celebrities battling to the North Pole with a vote-off day to day. Tamsin takes the offer with her agent also offering Lewis to go but he declines to face his responsibility with Paul. The cast is then reformed to match the show with Paul playing the cat and Greg Chip (Dean Whatton) the original cat playing Dick. Gina dumps Tony to be on her own after coming back from the airport after their flights were cancelled as the toilet company went bust. 

At the end, Lewis  plays football with Paul after the show was a success.

Characters 
John Bishop as Lewis Loud
Sheridan Smith as Tamsin Taylor
Samantha Spiro as Di Jenkins
Daniel Bishop as Paul
Michael Cochrane as Johnny Darby
Chesney Hawkes as himself
Mark Benton as Francis de Winter
Ami Metcalf as Chantelle Jenkins
Dean Whatton as Greg Chip
Kaye Wragg as Gina
Trevor Dwyer-Lynch as Tony
John MacMillan as Finlay
Lisa Jackson as Deborah
Kenneth Cranham as Jerry

References

External links
 

2012 in British television
Christmas television specials
Christmas in the United Kingdom
ITV (TV network) original programming
Pantomime